Edward Philip Monckton (1840 – 17 April 1916) was a British barrister and politician.

Born in Bareilly in India, while his father was serving in the East India Company, Monckton was educated privately, before studying at Trinity College, Cambridge.  In 1868, he became a barrister at Inner Temple.  He settled near Oundle, and was elected to Northamptonshire County Council, and also served as High Sheriff of Rutland in 1883–84.

Monckton was elected for the Conservative Party in North Northamptonshire at the 1895 UK general election, retiring in 1900.  He then served as Recorder of Northampton until his death, in 1916.

References

1840 births
1916 deaths
Conservative Party (UK) MPs for English constituencies
Councillors in Rutland
High Sheriffs of Rutland
Politicians from Bareilly
UK MPs 1895–1900